Sexually transmitted infections in the pornography industry deals with the occupational safety and health hazard of contracting sexually transmitted infections (STIs) by workers in the sex industry.
Since the 1980s many cases of pornographic performers contracting HIV/AIDS have been reported. However, since the mid 2000s strict adherence to rigorous STI testing, and limiting sexual contact with only fellow tested performers has halted the spread of HIV and other STIs in the industry.

Types of STIs
Because pornographic film making involves unsimulated sex, often without condoms, pornographic actors are particularly vulnerable to various sexually transmitted infections; especially HPV, Zika fever, chlamydia, gonorrhea,  syphilis, and HIV/AIDS.

Experts suggest there are a total number of thirty-five infections and diseases that can be transmitted sexually.

HIV cases

1980s and 1990s

According to former pornographic actress Shelley Lubben, a 1980s outbreak of HIV led to the death of 27 porn stars between 1985 and 1992, including Wade Nichols (who died in 1985), John Holmes (1988), Marc Stevens (1989), and Al Parker (1992). When Nichols died in 1985, his fellow porn star Ron Jeremy denied that Nichols' death was AIDS-related. Stevens died of AIDS in 1989, aged 46. Parker died in 1992 from complications of AIDS, aged 40.

In February 1986, Holmes was diagnosed as HIV-positive. Six months previously, he had tested negative. During the summer of 1986, Holmes, knowing his HIV status, agreed to perform in two pornographic films to be filmed in Italy, without informing the producers of his HIV status. Performers in one film, The Rise and Fall of the Roman Empress, were Ilona "Cicciolina" Staller, who later became a member of the Italian parliament, Tracey Adams, Christoph Clark, and Amber Lynn. Performers in the other film, The Devil In Mr. Holmes, were Adams, Lynn, Karin Schubert, and Marina Hedman. Subsequently, it was revealed that Holmes had consciously chosen not to reveal his HIV status to his producers or co-stars before engaging in unprotected sex for the filming. As his health failed, Holmes disingenuously attributed his condition to colon cancer and first confided that he had AIDS in January 1987. He died from AIDS-related complications on March 13, 1988, aged 43.

Marc Wallice, a known IV drug user, tested positive for HIV in 1998. On April 30, 1998, he was diagnosed by Adult Industry Medical (AIM) as HIV positive. It was alleged that he had hidden his HIV positive status for two years, with rumors that he accomplished this by using fake blood work through several HIV testing cycles to continue working. This speculation has been disputed and investigated using Wallice's tests, but it has not been doubted that during this period Wallice infected seven women on the set: Brooke Ashley, Tricia Devereaux, Caroline, Nena Cherry, Jordan McKnight, Barbara Doll, and Kimberly Jade.,

2000s
After three years of no reported HIV-issues within the industry, in April 2004, AIM diagnosed Darren James as being HIV-positive. It was concluded that James had been infected while engaging in unprotected anal sex with Brazilian actress Bianca Biaggi during a scene for the video Split That Booty 2 in Rio de Janeiro. AIM initiated an urgent search for other potentially infected performers. It was discovered that three actresses who had worked with James shortly after his return to the United States had also become infected. These were Canadians Lara Roxx and Miss Arroyo, and Czech-born Jessica Dee.

The heterosexual segment of the porn industry voluntarily shut down for 30 days (a 60-day moratorium was originally announced but it was lifted early) while it tried to deal with the situation. Darren James, Jessica Dee, and Lara Roxx were barred from further production of sexually explicit content. About 60 actors who had had contact with James or Roxx were barred from working until HIV tests were completed and they were declared HIV negative. A further estimated 130 actors who had had contact with James were tested and received an HIV-negative result. A total of five actors were diagnosed with the virus by the end of the moratorium: one male and four females, including one transgender woman named Jennifer.

In June 2009, AIM reported that a female adult entertainer had tested positive, though it was believed that transmission occurred in her private life. LA County Public Health claimed that there had been 16 "unreported" HIV cases in the adult film industry. The AIM Healthcare Foundation claimed those cases did not involve actors in production companies that followed their testing protocols and included members of the general public who used AIM Healthcare testing services or individuals attempting to work in the porn industry who never were able to obtain employment in adult films because of their failure to provide proof of negative status for HIV or other STDs.

2010s

On October 12, 2010, AIM reported that an actor or actress had been infected with HIV. The name and gender of the person was not released to the public. Vivid Entertainment and Wicked Pictures were the first companies to announce a production shutdown. Although Wicked Pictures allow some performers to wear condoms, the company shut down to wait for the quarantine list. Several other porn studios shut down as a preventive measure. At the time, no other performers tested HIV positive.

In December, the HIV positive performer was identified as Derrick Burts. Burts had worked in both heterosexual and gay pornography. Despite contracting gonorrhea, chlamydia and syphilis, Burts continued taking part in unprotected sex in films before quitting once he was diagnosed as being HIV positive. He was informed by the Adult Industry Medical Health Care Foundation that he had contracted the disease, which according to Burts, he received on a set outside the AIM system, while having oral sex scene with another "HIV positive male actor".

In August 2011, the industry was temporarily shut down because of news of a performer was testing positive for the virus. Diane Duke, executive director of the Free Speech Coalition, confirmed the situation. Production later resumed when a performer was retested and it came back negative.

In June 2013, a gay male performer tested positive for HIV in a routine FSC-conducted blood test. The anonymous performer had previously worked exclusively on condom-only movies. FSC determined that the infection did not take place on-set.

In August 2013, an adult female performer, Cameron Bay, tested HIV positive. In response, FSC organized an industry wide moratorium from August 21 to August 27. On September 4, Rod Daily, Cameron Bay's ex-boyfriend, announced he had also tested HIV positive. Two days later, a third anonymous female performer tested positive prompting FSC to organize a second moratorium from September 6 to September 20. All three infections were found to have taken place off-set.
Rumors surfaced of a fourth HIV positive test during September but they were never substantiated.

In December 2013, a male porn actor tested HIV positive, leading FSC to halt production for one week. This infection was also determined to have taken place off-set.

Testing and clinics
The Adult Industry Medical Health Care Foundation (AIM Healthcare or AIM) was founded in 1998, and helped to set up a monitoring system for the pornographic film industry in the United States, and pornographic film actors were required to be tested for HIV, chlamydia and gonorrhea every 30 days, and twice a year for hepatitis, syphilis and HSV. However AIM closed all its operations in May 2011, forcing the industry to look for other mechanisms for supporting and enforcing regular testing. The gap was filled by the Free Speech Coalition, which set up the Adult Production Health and Safety Services (APHSS) system, now known as Performer Availability Screening Services (PASS). Since 2011, STI testing for straight pornographic performers is being monitored by them.

Apart from taking necessary precautions like PrEP, performers are tested every fourteen days for HIV, syphilis, gonorrhea, chlamydia, hepatitis B and C and trichomoniasis. According to PASS, there has not be an on-set transmission of HIV on a regulated set since 2004. The industry considers the testing method to be a viable practice for safer sex. Canadian doctor and HIV/AIDS specialist Dr. Allan Ronald, who did groundbreaking studies on the transmission of STIs, said there's no doubt about the efficiency of the testing method, but he felt little uncomfortable, "because it’s giving the wrong message — that you can have multiple sex partners without condoms — but I can’t say it doesn’t work.

Pornographic actress Nina Hartley, stated that the time required for shooting a scene can be very long, and usage of condoms will be uncomfortable, as it causes friction burn, and opens up lesions in the genital mucosa. Advocating the testing method for performers, Hartley said, "Testing works for us, and condoms work for outsiders." Other female performers have also opposed the use of condoms at work. Citing the fact that chances for performers in the industry to contract HIV are much lower compared to sexually active persons outside the industry, they have vehemently opposed Measure B regulations which made the use of condoms mandatory in pornographic films. Their usage has been called an occupational hazard because of the breakage issues, causation of micro-tears, swelling, and yeast infections; which together all made them more susceptible for STIs.

Limitations and criticism 
As the Centers for Disease Control and Prevention (CDC) recommends screening for Herpes only in symptomatic cases, most STI tests do not include screening for either HSV-1 or HSV-2 strain unless specifically ordered by the physician. Meanwhile, asymptomatic persons positive for the virus can transmit it sexually.

Porn actors are not tested for HPV either. A test for HPV isn’t normally included in a standard STI screening for people under 30, as many of the HPV strains clear on their own. It's however recommend once for every five years in people above 30.

Legislation

Regulations to limit the spread of HIV Virus
Due to this limited outbreak, the California State government considered regulating the industry. Some proposed to mandate the wearing of condoms during sexually explicit scenes. Industry insiders say this would ruin sales of their wares since the unprotected content is one of the selling points of some of their films. They say the wearing of condoms ruins the sexual fantasies of many viewers. Insiders say that such regulation would force the industry underground, out of California or overseas where it would be more prone to health risks for performers. The non-profit Adult Industry Medical Health Care Foundation (AIM Healthcare) worked with the government, to develop policies that both the industry and the government would find acceptable.

2012 ballot measure in Los Angeles 
In the 2012 election, voters in Los Angeles were presented with Measure B ("Safer Sex In the Adult Film Industry Act") with the following text:

Proponents of the measure claimed pornography performers were significantly more likely to acquire HIV than the general population and that they are generally not given health insurance by their employers and so the tax payer would foot the bill for HIV treatment. Opponents claimed it to be a waste of tax dollars because of existing stringent HIV testing protocols and because nobody has contracted HIV on set since 2004 in the United States. 

The adult film industry members claimed that the industry monitors itself, and people will not watch scenes with condoms. The measure passed with 56% voting for and 44% voting against. FSC said it will appeal the law on constitutional grounds.

The AIDS Healthcare Foundation tried several times to have California's Department of Industrial Relations, Division of Occupational Safety and Health's Appeals Board force companies in the pornography industry to treat actors and actresses as employees subject to occupational safety and health regulation; in a 2014 case brought against Treasure Island Media an administrative judge found that the company did have to comply with regulations.

See also 
 Adult Industry Medical Health Care Foundation (AIM)
 AIDS Healthcare Foundation

Notes

References

Sources cited

Books

Journals and magazines

News and websites

Further reading
 

Condoms
HIV/AIDS
Occupational safety and health
Research on the effects of pornography
STDs in the sex industry